Julio Cesar Ramírez (born 10 August 1977) is a former Major League Baseball center fielder.  He played five seasons, starting in 1999 with the Florida Marlins, then moving on to the Chicago White Sox, Anaheim Angels and San Francisco Giants. Julio is currently the OF coach for the White Sox Dominican league team

References

External links
, or Retrosheet

1977 births
Living people
Acereros de Monclova players
Anaheim Angels players
Azucareros del Este players
Baseball players at the 2007 Pan American Games
Brevard County Manatees players
Calgary Cannons players
Calgary Vipers players
Chicago White Sox players
Dominican Republic expatriate baseball players in Canada
Dominican Republic expatriate baseball players in Italy
Dominican Republic expatriate baseball players in Mexico
Dominican Republic expatriate baseball players in the United States
Florida Marlins players
Fortitudo Baseball Bologna players
Fresno Grizzlies players
Gigantes del Cibao players
Gulf Coast Marlins players
Kane County Cougars players

Major League Baseball center fielders
Major League Baseball players from the Dominican Republic
Mexican League baseball center fielders
Norfolk Tides players
People from San Juan de la Maguana
Portland Sea Dogs players
Salt Lake Stingers players
San Francisco Giants players
Tucson Sidewinders players
Pan American Games competitors for the Dominican Republic